Powys County Council is the local authority for Powys, one of the administrative areas of Wales. The County Hall is in Llandrindod Wells.

History
The county of Powys was created on 1 April 1974 under the Local Government Act 1972, covering the area of the three administrative counties of Brecknockshire, Montgomeryshire, and Radnorshire, which were abolished at the same time. From 1974 until 1996 there were two principal tiers of local government, with Powys County Council as the upper tier authority and three district councils below it, each of which corresponded to one of the pre-1974 counties: Brecknock Borough Council, Montgomeryshire District Council, and Radnorshire District Council.

The three districts were abolished under the Local Government (Wales) Act 1994, with Powys County Council becoming a unitary authority with effect from 1 April 1996, taking on the functions formerly performed by the district councils.

Political control
The first election to the council was held in 1973, initially operating as a shadow authority before coming into its powers on 1 April 1974. Political control of the council since 1974 has been held by the following parties:

Upper-tier county council

Unitary authority

Leadership
The leaders of the council since 2002 (formally called the chairman of the board prior to 2011) have been:

Current composition 
The most recent election was in May 2022, which saw the Liberal Democrats emerge as the largest group followed by independents. A Liberal Democrat and Labour coalition formed, taking over the leadership of the council from the Independent and Conservative coalition which had led the council since 2017. The next election is due in 2027.

Council elections 
Elections are held every five years. Since the last ward boundary changes in 2022, 68 councillors have been elected from 60 wards. Prior to 2012, elections were generally held every four years.

Party with the most elected councillors in bold. Coalition agreements in Notes column.

Cabinet

2022-

2017-2022

Premises
The council has its headquarters at County Hall on Spa Road East in Llandrindod Wells, which opened in 1990. The site was formerly occupied by the Pump House Hotel, which had been the meeting place of the former Radnorshire County Council from 1889 and then served as both the offices and meeting place of Powys Council Council following the local government reorganisation in 1974. The old building was found to be structurally unstable in the late 1980s and it was decided to build a new county hall on the same site.

The council also has three area offices, being one inherited from each of the three former districts abolished in 1996:
Neuadd Brycheiniog in Brecon, built in the 1980s as the headquarters for Brecknock Borough Council.
The Gwalia in Llandrindod Wells, built in 1900 as the Gwalia Hotel, becoming offices of Radnorshire County Council 1950–1974 then Radnorshire District Council 1974–1996.
Park Office in Newtown, built in 1968 as Newtown Town Hall, being the shared headquarters of Newtown and Llanllwchaiarn Urban District and Newtown and Llanidloes Rural District Councils, then used as an area office for Montgomeryshire District Council 1974–1996
The former headquarters of Montgomeryshire District Council at Neuadd Maldwyn in Welshpool also served as an area office for Powys County Council until 2019 when it was sold.

Electoral wards

Powys is administered by Powys County Council and has 68 elected councillors representing 60 council wards. Although it is a unitary authority, the highway functions of the council, along with the allocation of small grants, are delegated to the three Shire Committees.  Brecknockshire has 24 councillors, Radnorshire has 15 and Montgomeryshire has 34.

Local elections take place every five years.  Some of the electoral wards are coterminous with communities (parishes) of the same name.  There are 112 communities in the principal area.  Nearly all communities have a local community council.

The following table lists the council wards, the political group representing them, and the communities they cover.  Communities with a community council are indicated with a '*':

External links
Powys County Council

References

Politics of Powys
Powys
Llandrindod Wells